Knight Security Systems, LLC sells physical security devices, headquartered in Austin, Texas with offices in Lubbock, Dallas, Houston, San Antonio, Corpus Christi, and McAllen. Its president is Phil Lake.

Company 
Knight Security Systems was founded in 1983. The company's security solutions include access control, video surveillance, and intrusion as well as fire detection systems.

In 2009, Knight Security made headlines for securing the largest single, public sector contract in Texas at $12.5 million with Texas Department of Aging and Disability Services (DADS) to install over 3,200 high-definition video surveillance camera systems in 335 buildings at 12 state school campuses. 

In 2015, Knight was awarded a contract with the Texas Lottery for over $100,000.

Compliance 
Knight and its staff hold industry certifications in the Texas Department of Public Safety's Private Security Bureau License, State of Texas TXMAS, and the State of Texas DIR.

See also 
 List of companies based in Austin, Texas

References 

Business software companies
Fire detection and alarm companies
Software companies established in 1983
Security companies of the United States
Companies based in Austin, Texas
Software companies of the United States